Daniel Adair Huseman (born June 28, 1952) is an American politician. A Republican, he has served in the Iowa House of Representatives since 1995.  He was born in Cherokee and received his BA from Buena Vista College. Huseman announced in January 2020 that he would retire from the state house upon the conclusion of his thirteenth term in office.

Huseman and his wife Barbara raised three children.

Electoral history

References

External links 

 Representative Dan Huseman official Iowa General Assembly site
 
 Financial information (state office) at the National Institute for Money in State Politics

Republican Party members of the Iowa House of Representatives
Living people
1952 births
People from Cherokee, Iowa
Buena Vista University alumni
People from Cherokee County, Iowa
21st-century American politicians